There It Is is the third studio album by English boy band 911. Composed entirely of covers, it was released through Virgin Records on 25 January 1999, peaking at number eight on the UK Albums Chart and managing four weeks on the chart overall.

Three singles were released from the album and were all top 10 hits—"More Than a Woman", "A Little Bit More" (which became the band's only UK number-one single) and "Private Number", featuring guest vocals from Natalie Jordan (or Fann Wong in Asian countries).

Track listing

Notes
 signifies an assistant producer

Charts and certifications

Charts

Certifications

References

1999 albums
911 (English group) albums
albums produced by Steve Levine
EMI Records albums
Virgin Records albums
Covers albums